Juan Taborda (ca. 1505 – 1569) was an Extremaduran captain and conquistador, companion of Jorge Robledo, during the conquest of Antioquia. He served as regidor and mayor, being the founder of the surname Taborda in Colombia, extended through his descendants throughout the South American continent.

Biography 
Taborda was born in Alburquerque, Extremadura, around 1515 with only his father known as Alonso Taborda Díaz. He had a brother, Francisco, and a sister Catalina de Rivera. Taborda arrived in the New World around the year 1545.

Juan Taborda was married to Leonor López de Santofimia, daughter of Diego Lopez de Santofimia, a Spanish nobleman, who served as a notary public in the city of Antioquia. He and his wife were parents of Juana Taborda, Juan Taborda and Leonor Taborda. His son Juan Taborda ("el Mozo") was mayor in 1573, 1575, 1581 and regidor in 1574.

See also 

 List of conquistadors in Colombia

References 

1500s births
1569 deaths
16th-century Spanish people
16th-century explorers
Spanish conquistadors
Extremaduran conquistadors
History of Antioquia Department
Spanish colonial governors and administrators